"Keepin' Halloween Alive" is a song by rock musician Alice Cooper, released in 2009.

The song was initially available exclusively on iTunes. The purchase of the single included a digital booklet and a sing-along, "Cooper-oke" version of the song featuring no vocals. A contest also took place with winners chosen by Alice himself based on video karaoke versions of the song sent in by fans. Only three winners were picked with prizes ranging from $1,000 to $250 and were submitted by October 31, 2009.

In October, 2010, a 7-inch vinyl single was released. This version was a limited edition of 2,300 copies, and had glow-in-the-dark vinyl. The B-side of the single was a live version of "I Love the Dead".

Personnel
Alice Cooper – lead vocals, background vocals
Piggy D. – guitars, background vocals
Dave Pino – lead guitars, bass, fender rhodes, theremin
David Spreng – drums, percussion, harpsichord

References

2009 singles
Songs written by Alice Cooper
Alice Cooper songs
2009 songs
Halloween songs